This is a list of the Maryland state historical markers in Baltimore City.

This is intended to be a complete list of the official state historical markers placed in Baltimore City, Maryland by the Maryland Historical Trust (MHT). The locations of the historical markers, as well as the latitude and longitude coordinates as provided by the MHT's database, are included below. There are currently 28 historical markers located in Baltimore City.

References

Baltimore City
Baltimore-related lists